Wintermute Lake is a lake in Stevens County, in the U.S. state of Minnesota.

Wintermute Lake was named for Charles Wintermute, a pioneer who settled near the lake.

See also
List of lakes in Minnesota

References

Lakes of Minnesota
Lakes of Stevens County, Minnesota